The Northern Explorer is a long-distance passenger train operated by The Great Journeys of New Zealand division of KiwiRail between Auckland and Wellington in the North Island of New Zealand, along the North Island Main Trunk (NIMT). Three services operate per week in each direction between Auckland's The Strand Station and Wellington railway station. The Northern Explorer replaced the Overlander from 25 June 2012.

It was suspended in December 2021, after suspension in August for COVID-19 lockdown. However, it restarted on 25 September 2022.

History

Origins
The first regular daylight Wellington–Auckland passenger train services, augmenting the older overnight services, were the steam-hauled Daylight Limited and diesel-hauled Scenic Daylight, which ran primarily during summer months and Easter holiday period for many years from the 1920s onwards. The arrival of the Blue Streak and later Silver Fern railcars saw an end for a time to regular carriage trains. At the time of its cessation, The Overlander was usually hauled by DC or EF locomotives with NZR 56-foot carriages.

Re-branding as the Northern Explorer 
In 2012, passenger numbers were in decline and KiwiRail decided to replace the Overlander with the Northern Explorer, from Monday 25 June 2012. The timetable was accelerated by eliminating intermediate stops, except Paraparaumu, Palmerston North, Ohakune, National Park, Otorohanga (summer only), Hamilton and Papakura. From October 2016, fire-suppressed DFB class locomotives (as required for diesel-hauled passenger trains in tunnels) were assigned to the service.

The service used one AKC and three AK class carriages, an AKL class luggage van and an AKV class power/viewing van from the Coastal Pacific. A larger AKS luggage van, converted from SA, replaced AKL in 2019.

Patronage 
Numbers rose 71% from 2013 to 2018, or about 65,000 a year and slightly more than the Overlander numbers.

Former stops 
The Northern Explorer served the stations shown at the foot of this page. There were variations from 2012. Papakura and Paraparaumu were added on 15 October 2012. Otorohanga was added on 10 December 2012. The Auckland terminus was moved from Britomart to The Strand Station on 21 December 2015.

References

Further reading

External links
The Great Journeys of New Zealand - Northern Explorer

Long-distance passenger trains in New Zealand
Railway services introduced in 2012
2012 establishments in New Zealand
Named passenger trains of New Zealand